Vorokhta is a railway station that is located in town of Vorokhta, Ivano-Frankivsk Oblast in Ukraine. It is part of the Ivano-Frankivsk administration (Lviv Railways). The station is located next to the town's center and situated on a segment between Deliatyn and Dilove (Zakarpattia Oblast) which is next to the border with Romania.

Overview
The station has two platforms (one island platform) allowing embarkment of passengers onto two trains simultaneously. Three tracks that stretch along the station leave extra room for easy passing. Among notable railroad infrastructure in the area are bridges, one over the Prut River and another pedestrian over rail tracks at the north end of the station. To south of the station towards Rakhiv, there is a railway crossing with barrier.

Among other major rail infrastructures in the area is an old stone railroad bridge that was built in 1884 when the railroad was first installed in the area. Stretching also over the Prut River right next to the newly installed bridge, it is in poor conditions and overgrown with vegetation.

The station is most often served by the D1 multiple unit. There is also a railbus Ivano-Frankivsk - Vorokhta that is served by a Polish manufactured train PESA. Among services provided at the station are embarkment and disembarkment of passengers and cargo for commuter and regional lines. Sale of tickets on all trains is available on site. There is also a ramp for loading and unloading of vehicles onto a train. The local wood processing factory has an access for loading and unloading. There is an abandoned and unused branching off onto a narrow gauge railroad.

External links
 Vorokhta rail station at railwayz.info
 Video of a railbus Ivano-Frankivsk - Vorokhta. December 2010.

Vorokhta
Railway stations in Ivano-Frankivsk Oblast
1895 establishments in Ukraine